Flint Hill School, founded in 1956, is a private, co-educational, college preparatory school, in Oakton, Virginia, serving grades JK–12.

History
Flint Hill School was founded in 1956 by Don Niklason as the Flint Hill Preparatory School, a co-educational day school with 18 students in grades K–8.

The school's origins date back to the state of Virginia's resistance to the Supreme Court of the United States' 1954 Brown v. Board of Education decision holding that racial segregation in public schools is unconstitutional. In 1956, the year of the school's founding, Virginia Senator Harry F. Byrd, Sr. declared a policy of Massive Resistance against compliance with Brown v. Board of Education, and the Virginia Assembly enacted the Stanley Plan, a package of thirteen statutes designed to ensure Virginia's public schools remained segregated. In 1959 the Fairfax County School Board approved tuition grants for 60 students to attend private schools and thereby avoid desegregated public schools. Of those initial grants, 44 went to students attending the Flint Hill School. Fairfax County Public School Assistant Superintendent George Pope remarked to the Washington Post, "We've just about put that school in business."

Students attended classes in the Miller House, an estate home belonging to the Francis Pickens Miller family. In 1986 Flint Hill purchased  of property several blocks away at the corner of Chain Bridge and Jermantown Road, and the Miller House was transported to the new campus, where it now serves as an administrative building.

In 1990, the new academic building was only partially finished and funding for its completion was in doubt. A group of educational and civic leaders from Northern Virginia led by John T. Hazel, Jr., then acquired the school and reorganized it as a nonprofit independent day school. The 1990–91 academic year began on the new campus with 65 faculty members and an enrollment of 425 students, in grades K–12. By the late 1990s, with more than 700 students, there was a need to expand. In 1998 Flint Hill acquired parcels of property totaling  within one mile of the existing campus. Groundbreaking took place for the Upper School Campus in summer 2000 and classes began there in September 2001.

In 2010, Flint Hill introduced the 1:1 technology program, providing all students with Apple Inc. computers and tablets. In 2011, it was named an "Apple Virginia Site School". In 2013 and 2015, it was recognized as an "Apple Distinguished School", an award Apple gives to schools that "demonstrate Apple's vision for learning with technology".

In 2019, Flint Hill began fundraising for a middle school facility designed to educate 7th and 8th grade students. The new Peterson Middle School opened for the 2020-2021 school year. 

In June 2022, Headmaster John Thomas retired after 17 years of service to the school. Patrick McHonett succeeded Thomas as Head of School for the 2022-2023 school year.

As of 2022, Flint Hill has three campuses with more than 1,000 students and 237 teachers.

Extracurricular activities 
The Upper School has three continually published, on-campus student publications: The Flint Hill View (news, arts, sports, opinion, and editorial newspaper), The Rough Draft (literary and arts magazine), and The Iditarod (yearbook, formerly entitled The Talon). Both middle and upper school students can take part in class government through the Student Council Association.

Athletics
The school participates in the Independent School League (ISL) for girls' sports and the Mid-Atlantic Athletic Conference (MAC) for boys' sports. There are 22 different sports, with 32 middle school and 35 upper school teams.

Between 2007 and 2017 Flint Hill produced 165 college athletes with 83 of them going division 1.

Flint Hill's volleyball team has been ranked  1 in the country three times and went on a span of 44 wins before losing a match.

The Flint Hill basketball team was ranked No. 1 in the country by USA Today in 1987 in former NBA player Dennis Scott's senior season.

Championships

Boys' basketball:
USA TODAY National Champions
1986
VISAA Division I State Champions 1995
VISAA Division I State Semi-finalist 2005
MAC Champions: 1995, 1997, 2004, 2005, 2006, 2009, 2010, 2011, 2019
MAC Tournament Champions: 2008, 2009, 2010
FH Tip-Off Tournament Champions: 2004, 2007, 2011, 2013
Football:
 VISAA Division I State Champions: 2017, 2018
 VISAA Division I State Finalist: 2008
 VISAA Division I State Semi-finalist: 2006, 2007, 2011, 2013, 2015, 2016
 MAC Champions: 2006, 2007, 2008, 2009, 2012, 2013, 2015, 2017, 2018, 2019
Boys' lacrosse:
 VISAA Division II State Semi-finalist: 2007
 VISAA Division I State Semi-finalist: 2009
 MAC Champions: 2007, 2008, 2009, 2009, 2010
 MAC Tournament Champions: 2008, 2010, 2014
Ice hockey:
 Dominion Cup Champions: 2011, 2012, 2013, 2015
Boys' soccer:
 VISAA Division I State Semi-finalist: 2005, 2006, 2007
 VISAA Division I State Finalist: 2014
 MAC Champions: 1994, 2007, 2015, 2016
 MAC Tournament Champions: 2014, 2015, 2016
Boys' tennis:
 VISAA Division I State Champions: 2006, 2007, 2008
 MAC Champions: 2006, 2008
 MAC Tournament Champions: 2006, 2008
Golf:
 MAC Champions: 1997, 2004, 2005, 2006, 2011, 2012, 2013, 2014, 2016
Baseball:
 MAC Champions: 2005, 2006, 2008, 2009, 2010, 2011, 2013, 2014, 2015, 2016
 MAC Tournament Champions: 2008, 2009, 2010, 2011, 2014
 VISAA Division I State Semi-finalist: 2013, 2014, 2016
Volleyball:
 VISAA Division I State Champions: 2008, 2009, 2010, 2012, 2013, 2014, 2015, 2017, 2018, 2019, 2021, 2022
 VISAA Division I State Finalist: 2016
 VISAA State Semi-finalist: 2005
 ISL "A" Champions: 2005
 ISL "AA" Champions: 2008, 2009, 2010, 2012, 2013, 2014, 2015, 2016, 2017, 2018, 2019, 2021, 2022
 ISL "AA" Tournament Champions: 2008, 2009, 2010, 2012, 2013, 2014, 2015, 2016, 2017, 2018, 2019, 2021, 2022
 DC Metro City Champions: 2009, 2010, 2012, 2013, 2014, 2015, 2016, 2017, 2018, 2019
 FH Invitational Tournament Champions: 2005, 2007, 2008, 2010, 2012, 2014, 2016, 2018, 2019, 2022
 Washington Post No. 1 Ranking: 2009, 2010, 2014, 2017, 2018, 2019, 2021, 2022
 Garden State Challenge Tournament Champions: 2017
 Garden State Challenge Tournament Runnerups: 2019

Rivalry with The Potomac School

Flint Hill has a sports rivalry with The Potomac School in McLean, Virginia, dating to 1992 when both schools played at George Mason University for the first time and Flint Hill defeated Potomac in an overtime basketball victory.

Notable alumni 
John R. Allen, Commander, International Security Assistance Force and United States Forces - Afghanistan. 
Justin Bonomo, professional poker player.
Randolph Childress, former NBA player.
John Cochran, Survivor Winner (TV SHOW)
Tommy Doyle, MLB Baseball Pitcher
Jared Leto, actor and frontman of 30 Seconds to Mars, dropped out
George Lynch, former NBA player.
Dennis Scott, former NBA player.
John Stertzer, Major League Soccer player.
Ronny Thompson, Emmy Award-winning broadcaster
Lorena Castillo de Varela, First Lady of Panama 2014 – 2019.
Zain Naghmi, professional Super Smash Bros. Melee player
Qudus Wahab,Georgetown Basketball Player.

References

Educational institutions established in 1956
Independent School League
Preparatory schools in Virginia
Private K-12 schools in Virginia
1956 establishments in Virginia